Lajos Baranyai (8 January 1939 – 11 August 1999) was a Hungarian boxer. He competed in the men's featherweight event at the 1960 Summer Olympics.

References

External links
 

1939 births
1999 deaths
Hungarian male boxers
Olympic boxers of Hungary
Boxers at the 1960 Summer Olympics
Martial artists from Budapest
Featherweight boxers